Mariano Rossell y Arellano (18 July 1894, Esquipulas, Guatemala - 10 December 1964, Guatemala City) was a Guatemalan Roman Catholic clergyman. He was the fifteenth archbishop of Guatemala from 1939 to 1964 and the first Prelate Nullius of Esquipulas. He played a decisive role during the rule of colonel Jacobo Arbenz (1951–1954), accusing it of communism and atheism in sermons and services. After Arbenz's overthrow, he managed to retain the church's right to own property and to run schools, as well as setting up the Jesuit-run Rafael Landivar University and gaining the promotion of the prelature's main church to minor basilica status.

Sources

1894 births
1964 deaths
20th-century Roman Catholic archbishops in Guatemala
Roman Catholic archbishops of Guatemala (1743-2013)